The Book of Ballymote (RIA MS 23 P 12, 275 foll.), was written in 1390 or 1391 in or near the town of Ballymote, now in County Sligo, but then in the tuath of Corann.

Production and history
This book was compiled towards the end of the 14th century at the castle of Ballymote for Tonnaltagh McDonagh, who was then in occupation of the castle. The chief compiler was Manus O'Duignan, one of a family who were ollavs and scribes to the McDonagh and the McDermots. Other scribes of the book were Solomon O'Droma, a member of a famous Co. Fermanagh family, and a Robert McSheedy. The book is a compilation of older works, mostly loose manuscripts and valuable documents handed down from antiquity that came into possession of McDonagh.

The first page of the work contains a drawing of Noah's Ark as conceived by the scribe. The first written page is missing and the second opens with a description of the ages of the world.
Patrick and his household; Cormac's instructions to a king; and a physical and geological survey of Ireland. Part of the work is devoted to the sagas of Finn and Brian Boru, and the Lebor na Cert (Book of Rights). It also contains treatises on the metre and the profession of a poet, and on the Ogham writing and language. The book ends with several translations from Greek: the destruction of Troy and the wanderings of Ulysses, followed by a resume of Virgil's 'Aeneid', beginning with Nestor's speech to the Greeks.

The Book of Ballymote, like many of its kind, has made history by its wanderings. For over a hundred years it was a treasured possession of the McDonaghs of Corran. About the beginning of the 16th century, it fell into the possession of the O'Donnells with whom it remained until the Flight of the Earls in 1603. From 1620 until 1767 it was in the library of Trinity College, Dublin. It disappeared from the library and was later found in Burgundy, France. In 1785 it was returned to the Royal Irish Academy where it remained as one of the Academy's most treasured possessions. The work was photographed by the Academy in 1887 and two hundred copies of it were made. One copy is in the diocesan archives and others in libraries.

Description

The first page of the work contains a drawing of Noah's Ark. The first written page is lost, and the second page describes the ages of the world.
a life of Saint Patrick (6r)
a copy of the Lebor Gabála Érenn (8r) 
Tecosca Cormaic "The Instructions of King Cormac" and other stories concerning king Cormac mac Airt
Triads of Ireland
stories of Fionn Mac Cumhail and Brian Bóruma
various genealogies of clans and kings
Christian kings of Ulster (34v)
Christian kings of Leinster (35v)
Christian kings of Connaught (37v)
of the Munster families (97r)
Dál gCais (102v)
rules of the different measures of Irish versification (157r)
the only known copy of the Auraicept na n-Éces, or "scholars' primer"(169r)
the Lebor na gCeart (Book of Rights) (181r)
The book ends with various Greek and Latin fragments on the fall of Troy, including a fragment of the Aeneid.

Editions
Robert Atkinson. NY: AMS Press. 
O'Donovan, The Book of Rights, ed. and trans. 1847.
The Book of Ballymote: Photographic facsimile with introduction by R. Atkinson, (Dublin 1887).

References

 McDonagh, James, History of Ballymote and the Parish of Emlaghfad (1998).  
 Harrison, A.: 'Leabhar Bhaile an Mhóta ag tús an 18ú aois', Éigse 23 (1989), 147-50.
 Ó Concheanainn, T.: 'The Book of Ballymote', Celtica 14 (1981), 15-25.

External links
Royal Irish Academy description
The Book of Ballymote (excerpt of McDonagh 1998)
 Genealogies from the Book of Ballymote
Leabhar Bhaile an Mhóta (ria.ie)
Leabhar Bhaile an Mhóta
Irish Script on Screen has digital images of the document.
Family History Library also provides digital images of the document.

1390s books
Ballymote
Early Irish literature
Irish manuscripts
14th-century illuminated manuscripts
Irish texts
Royal Irish Academy Library
Irish-language literature